Johnson Township may refer to one of the following places in the State of Illinois:

 Johnson Township, Christian County, Illinois
 Johnson Township, Clark County, Illinois

See also

Johnson Township (disambiguation)

Illinois township disambiguation pages